Bolanjab (also Romanized as Bolanjāb) is a village in Alqurat Rural District, in the Central District of Birjand County, South Khorasan Province, Iran. At the 2006 census, its population was 154, in 51 families.

References 

Populated places in Birjand County